Maserati made four naturally-aspirated, V12 racing engines, designed for Formula One; between  and . Their second engine was 250 F1 V12; in accordance with the 2.5 L engine regulations set by the FIA. One sports car, a modified version of the Maserati 350S, also used V12 engine, with a  displacement, and produced .

4CLT O.S.C.A. engine
For 1951 B. Bira modified his '49-spec 4CLT to accept a more powerful, naturally aspirated OSCA V12 engine. With it Bira won the Goodwood race early in the season, but in its only World Championship appearance, at the 1951 Spanish Grand Prix, it retired on the first lap.

250F F1 V12 engine / Tipo 9/Tipo 10 engine
In 1956 three 250F T2 engines first appeared for the works drivers. Developed by Giulio Alfieri, and sometimes using the all-new  V12 engine, although it offered little or no real advantage over the older straight-6. It was later developed into the 3-litre V12 that won two races powering the Cooper T81 and T86 from 1966 to 1969, the final "Tipo 9" and "Tipo 10" variant of the engine having three valves and two spark plugs per cylinder.

Applications

Formula One cars
Maserati 4CLT
Maserati 250F
Cooper T81
Cooper T86

Sports cars
Maserati 350S

Reference 

Maserati
Formula One engines
Gasoline engines by model
V12 engines